Road 68 is a road in central and eastern Iran in dry areas. It connects Yazd in Yazd Province, to Birjand in South Khorasan Province. This road is part of Yazd-Mashhad Road.

Along this road is the landing site codenamed "Desert One", which was part of Operation Eagle Claw - the American hostage rescue attempt.

References

External links 

 Iran road map on Young Journalists Club

68
Transportation in South Khorasan Province
Transportation in Yazd Province